Tale of Two Sisters is a 1989 drama film about two sisters who, having not seen each other for 5 years, catch up and relive childhood experiences. It is directed by Adam Rifkin and narrated by Charlie Sheen, and stars Claudia Christian and Valerie Breiman as the two sisters.

Premise
Phil resents her sister Liz for being the focus of their mother's love and has not spoken to her since she attended Liz's wedding. Years later Phil visits Liz at her expensive home where she lives with their parents and the two argue over their feelings about each other.

Cast 

 Claudia Christian as Elizabeth "Liz"
 Valerie Breiman as Phil 
 Tom Hodges as Aunt Sparkle / Butler
 Robert Munic as Prince / Jester 
 Jeff Conaway as Taxi driver
 Sydney Lassick as Dad
 Dee Coppola  as Mom
 Peter Berg as Gardener  
 Laurianne Jamison as Housekeeper / murderous woman on beach
 Danielle von Zerneck as Adult bug girl
 Charity Katz  as Young Elizabeth "Liz"
 Raeanah Turrow as Young Phyllis
 Samantha Hallie Culp as Young Bug Girl
 Brian Belknap as Grave Digger
 Craig Stark as Elizabeth's Lover
 Hastie Purchase as Chacha
 Raisa Slepoy as Russian Maid
 Beau Jack as Algebra Teacher
 Lawrence Bender as Thug #1
 Harvey S. Seymour as Butcher
 Matt O'Toole as Thug #2
 Robert Paul Munich as Jester
 Buddy Daniels as Meanie the Clown
 Michele Barinholtz as Gum Chewing Broad
 Schmol Stinkystein as himself
 Dean Mynerd as Mime
 Reggie Springer as Dad's Singing Dog
 Bunker Pug as Mom's Dog
 Charlie as Liz's Cat
 Chuck Borden - Stunt Coordinator

External links 
 
 Tale of Two Sisters – on the Troma Entertainment movie database

1989 films
1989 drama films
Troma Entertainment films
American drama films
Films about sisters
Films directed by Adam Rifkin
Films produced by Lawrence Bender
1980s English-language films
1980s American films